The Women's aerials event in freestyle skiing at the 2006 Winter Olympics in Turin, Italy began on 21 February and concluded on 22 February at Sauze d'Oulx.

Results

Qualification
The qualification round took place on 21 February, with 23 skiers competing. The top 12 advanced to the final.

Final
The final took place on the evening of 22 February. Evelyne Leu was 5th after her first jump, but on her second she earned the highest score of the final round, a 107.93, to win the gold medal.

References

Women's freestyle skiing at the 2006 Winter Olympics
2006 in women's sport
Women's events at the 2006 Winter Olympics